Gràcia is a railway station located under Plaça de Gal·la Placídia in the Gràcia district of Barcelona. It is served both by lines L6 and L7 of the Barcelona Metro, and by lines S1 and S2 of the Metro del Vallès commuter rail system. All these lines are operated by Ferrocarrils de la Generalitat de Catalunya, who also run the station.

The station will be part of line 8 L8 in the next future (2023) with the extension of that line from Espanya metro station, and that becomes a junction station for the three FGC Barcelona Metro lines in operation in the city.

See also
List of Barcelona Metro stations
List of railway stations in Barcelona

References

External links
 
 Information and photos about the station at Trenscat.com
 Information and photos about the station at TransporteBCN.es

Stations on the Barcelona–Vallès Line
Barcelona Metro line 6 stations
Barcelona Metro line 7 stations
Transport in Gràcia
Railway stations opened in 1929
Railway stations located underground in Spain